Theresa Lopez - Fitzgerald Winthrop is a fictional character from the NBC/DirecTV soap opera, Passions. She was portrayed by Lindsay Korman throughout the program's tenure, with Priscilla Garita temporarily assuming the role from August 30–September 28, 2004, while Korman was on maternity leave. On December 31, 2001, and January 2, 2002, Alyse Gregory portrayed Theresa in flashbacks. Taylor Balen portrayed Theresa in another flashback in 2005.

Character history

Early years
Theresa was the third child and first daughter of Martin Fitzgerald and Pilar Lopez-Fitzgerald. While just a toddler, her father abandoned the family to go to Mexico with Katherine Barrett, although the reason for his disappearance wasn't revealed until much later. With her mother working two jobs, the young Theresa was raised primarily by her eldest brother, Antonio. Antonio then disappeared as well when Theresa was a teenager, at which time her older brother Luis then helped Pilar care for Theresa and her younger brother Miguel. During her teenage years, Theresa developed an infatuation with Ethan Crane, the son of her mother's employer, Ivy Crane. Unknown to her at the time, Theresa and Ethan once met each other when they were children, something that wasn't revealed until much later and she was unknowingly in love with him since childhood, she became convinced that they were fated for each other and would one day marry. Her best childhood friend and confidant was Whitney Russell.

First relationship with Ethan
Passions debuted with Theresa's heartthrob Ethan's return to Harmony, along with his girlfriend Gwen Hotchkiss. Theresa immediately began doing whatever she could to get close to Ethan, usually coming up with harebrained schemes that ended in disasters such as burying Ethan in fish at the cannery, spilling food on him, etc. Ethan came to believe that Theresa was criminally stalking him and hired a private investigator to track her down. As part of her plan to get close to Ethan, Theresa worked under disguise as an assistant for Ethan's mother Ivy. It was through this position that Ethan and Theresa came to know each other and Ethan forgave Theresa for the accidents.

Eventually, Theresa was successful in sparking a relationship with Ethan in the fall of 2000, and they were engaged to be married on Christmas Eve of that year. Theresa promised her mother that she would not sleep with Ethan before the day of their wedding, so the couple waited until just after midnight the morning of the wedding to make love, unbeknownst to either conceiving Little Ethan in the process.

The wedding was interrupted when Ethan's enraged mother, Ivy, crashed her car into the church before they could take their vows and produced a tabloid claiming that Theresa had sent information on Ethan's true paternity to a tabloid exposing that he was not a Crane, but in fact, the son of Sam Bennett even though Gwen and Rebecca had in truth framed Theresa for destroying Ethan's life. Theresa then fled to Bermuda, determined to find Julian and convince him to adopt Ethan and make him the Crane heir anyway.

While in Bermuda, Theresa gets drunk and Julian takes advantage of her before going through a marriage ceremony with him, which is later shown to have never been valid. Theresa returned home to Harmony and resumed her relationship with Ethan. He was furious to learn she had apparently drunkenly married Julian but forgave her on the condition that she stop lying to him. She soon learned she was pregnant but lied to Ethan about it when she signed the annulment papers because she thought it was Julian's child. Unfortunately, Ethan learned of her pregnancy, like her marriage, in yet another tabloid, and broke things off with her because he couldn't trust her.

Rivalry with Gwen
Although Theresa continued to pursue Ethan, she was unsuccessful at winning Ethan back before he wed Gwen in 2003 after she became pregnant with Ethan's baby. After the marriage, Theresa left Harmony for Los Angeles. However, in a twist of fate, Ethan and Gwen had traveled there as well to see a specialist regarding their problematic pregnancy. When they met in L.A., Ethan and Theresa kissed (unknowingly in front of a TV camera), and Gwen ended up seeing them on the evening news from her hospital bed. Enraged, Gwen confronted Theresa at an apartment and started a physical confrontation that caused her to miscarry her unborn daughter Sarah.

Back in Harmony, Gwen's mother Rebecca formulated a plan to take Little Ethan away from Theresa while Ethan and Gwen decided to have a baby using a surrogate mother. Little Ethan was eventually adopted by Ethan and Gwen. To get her son back, Theresa drugged and kidnapped Ethan and Gwen's surrogate and had herself implanted with Gwen and Ethan's fertilized embryo, planning to trade the baby for Little Ethan. Later, Theresa believed she had miscarried the baby and tried unsuccessfully to get Fox Crane to impregnate her. Knowing she had only a limited window of time to replace the fetus, she stole a date rape drug (gamma-hydroxybutyric acid) from Eve Russell and slipped it into Ethan's wine, then dressed up like Gwen and sneaked into his bed resulting in Theresa getting pregnant with a second baby.

Thereafter, Theresa was pregnant with an unusual set of twins—one presumably belonged to Ethan and Gwen, and the other to Ethan and Theresa. Theresa was eventually unable to carry both children to term, and the boy, who was to be named Nathan, was medically aborted. After the baby girl, originally named Ashley, was born fourteen weeks early, Theresa shocked Gwen (who believed she was the child's biological mother) with the news that the child might be hers, and that she had no intent on giving her up no matter who the biological mother was. DNA tests were performed on the newborn to establish both paternity and maternity, and Ethan and Theresa were confirmed to be the girl's biological parents, and Theresa renamed her Jane. Ethan's plans to sue Theresa for custody of Jane were interrupted after Gwen kidnapped Jane and stabbed Theresa in the back with a scalpel. Ethan then offered to let Theresa have the baby if she would agree to drop the charges against Gwen.

Theresa refused to drop the charges, and Gwen was acquitted in court after Eve testified to the court that her break from reality had been brought on by drug interactions and that Gwen could not be held responsible for her actions. The judge then awarded custody to Gwen and Ethan, due to her concern over how Jane was conceived.

Marriage to Alistair
Theresa wed Alistair Crane on October 3, 2005, after he promised to help her get back her daughter Jane, and because she wanted access to the Crane mansion itself, where she believed she could uncover information that would clear her name in regard to her wedding day tabloid scandal.

Unbeknownst to Theresa, Harmony's arch-enemy had plans to use her, as well; she signed a pre-nuptial agreement in which she consented to sexual relations with him (she later attempts to renege led to her being repeatedly raped by Alistair with Gwen's help in the fall of 2005) and she also signed her consent to Alistair's adoption of her son, Little Ethan, who would become the new Crane heir, to be molded in Alistair's image.

Unable to leave her son despite Ethan's offers to help her escape, Theresa made the best out of her situation, frantically fantasizing about the man she loved while the elderly Alistair used her body (and while, on one notable occasion, her rival Gwen prevented Ethan from stopping Alistair from raping Theresa).  She eventually began repeated attempts to murder Alistair, one of which attempts went horribly awry when Ethan consumed the poisoned guacamole intended for Alistair and went into a coma.

Both during her husband's coma (which he faked as part of a trick to lure Harmony residents to Rome) and after his apparent July 2006 demise in Italy (where his train was struck by a missile), Theresa assumed control of Crane Industries on behalf of her son.  She's used Alistair's money and power to mixed ends — bribing and blackmailing employers to prevent Ethan from getting a job and to trap Gwen in one but also shoring up Crane fiscally, attempting to make the company both stronger and fairer as her son's inheritance.

There remains some question as to the extent to which Theresa would have power at Crane were it publicly known that her child is not Julian Crane's son, but Ethan Winthrop's, a question complicated by Alistair Crane having legally adopted the boy.

Relationship with Jared
Jared Casey was the new guy in town in July/August or 2006 when he set his eyes on Theresa. Jared first met Theresa when she spilled her drink on Jared at the Blue Note nightclub. Jared became irate and began to argue with Theresa. Later he apologized and asked Theresa to dance; she agreed in order to annoy Gwen by making Ethan jealous.  The two had a tense early relationship, with Jared repeatedly making claims and remarks that Theresa perceived as being chauvinistic, materialistic, or otherwise intolerant, a fact which was complicated by Jared's failure to recognize Theresa as the CEO of Crane Industries; but, once the case of mistaken identity was overcome, he gradually proved to her that she had been oversensitive.  She gave him a chance to help her move on from Ethan, as well as what had been earmarked as Ethan's job as head legal counsel at Crane Industries, and he gave her romance, attention, and the pet name "Tess", which she initially didn't care for.

The arc of their relationship from the time they met in the late summer of 2006 until Jared proposed to Theresa at Kay and Fox's wedding around New Year's 2007, was characterized by Theresa's conviction that Jared would be the man who finally allowed her to get over Ethan Winthrop.  However, Ethan's jealousy of Jared and conviction that the man was a liar and a criminal who was hiding a significant secret led to Ethan's frequent interference in Theresa's relationship with her new beau; Jared, in that time, broke off his relationship with "Tess" multiple times, believing she was still pining for her old flame.

Blackmailer
In January 2007, Harmony's "Nightstalker" (who is presumed to be the same entity alternately referred to as "the peeping tom," "the rapist," "the blackmailer," and "the half-man/half-woman") put Ethan in a potion-induced trance, whereupon Ethan drove across town, crawled into bed with Theresa and began making love to her in the darkness.  The pair were caught by Jared and Gwen; Gwen decided to leave Ethan and filed for divorce, while Jared, believing Theresa's claim that, in the darkness, she'd believed she was making love to him and not Ethan, insisted that Theresa file sexual assault charges.  When Theresa refused, Jared left her, accurately perceiving that she still had feelings for her ex.

Shortly thereafter, Ethan and Jane moved into the Crane mansion with Theresa, and Theresa and Ethan discussed starting anew with one another now that they were both free.  With Gwen out of the picture, Theresa prepared to tell Ethan the truth—that her son was also his, and not Julian Crane's.

The idyll, however, was short-lived; Theresa realized she needed her son's Crane status to hold onto the money and resources necessary to save her brothers' lives, as the blackmailer, who had framed Theresa's brothers for crimes they were innocent of, used his knowledge of Theresa's secret and the power he had over her brothers' futures to coerce her into leaving Ethan — whom the blackmailer wants for himself — and marrying Jared.

Theresa stalled, making desperate efforts to recover the evidence of her secret, hiring manipulative tabloid reporter Vincent Clarkson, and even telling Jared that she was being blackmailed and enlisting his help.  Jared made contact with mysterious "old friends," entering what he cryptically described as a "deal with the devil" to try to help her, but ended up getting shot in the abdomen, probably by the blackmailer, for his efforts.

Eventually, Theresa was out of options, and in April 2007 was coerced into marrying Jared and attempting to conceive his child, much to Ethan's dismay. Jared remained ignorant about his bride's lack of enthusiasm about their marriage and family, and also did not know that Ethan and Theresa had continued their affair, with Ethan repeatedly insisting that Theresa divorce Jared as soon as he managed to exonerate her brothers and reveal the blackmailer's identity. Because Ethan and Theresa repeatedly ignored the blackmailer's demand that they stay away from one another, they were violently attacked multiple times, including Ethan being tied naked to a chair and molested, Theresa being threatened at knifepoint, Ethan nearly being pressed to death between two walls, and Ethan and Theresa being trapped inside the burning Crane Mausoleum.

Theresa found herself in an unenviable position, wanting both to help her brothers and to protect her secret, in part because she doesn't trust Ethan to forgive her for keeping the secret when he finds out.  Despite Theresa's secret and the fact that both she and Ethan remain married to other people, Theresa accepted Ethan's proposal of marriage on June 27, 2007; upon finding out about her continued relationship with Ethan, Jared gracefully bowed out of the picture and wished Theresa every happiness, while Ethan's wife, Gwen, has also signed her divorce papers.

Increasingly, Theresa's refusal to tell Ethan her secret seems more motivated by fear of his reaction than fear of the Blackmailer or fear for her brothers.  Her situation is complicated by the fact that as many people in Harmony know her secret as don't; while Ethan remains in the dark, people who know that he is Little Ethan's father include Whitney, Pilar, Chad, Julian, Eve, Father Lonigan, Luis, Jared, Vincent, and, perhaps most pressingly for Theresa (who is being encouraged on all fronts to tell Ethan the truth), Gwen and Rebecca, who have committed to using Theresa's secret to destroy her relationship with Ethan.

Theresa was almost killed in the electric chair at Harmony's prison by Sheridan working on the Blackmailer's orders, but was inadvertently saved from death by Gwen.

NBC finale
On August 17, 2007, it was revealed that Alistair was in fact alive; it was soon established that Alistair had not only been responsible for twisting grandson Vincent's already fragile psyche, but had also been behind Vincent's actions as the Blackmailer. Vincent told Alistair of the secret that he had learned — that Little Ethan had been fathered by Ethan, not Julian — and Alistair was enraged that Theresa had duped him. Theresa finally married Ethan on August 20, 2007. Gwen tried to stop the wedding and honeymoon by telling Ethan the truth, but was stopped by Alistair, who wanted to keep Little Ethan's real paternity a secret to protect his corporate interests. Alistair's attempt to poison Theresa (with Rebecca and Gwen's help) put Ethan in a coma instead. With Alistair now known to be alive, Rebecca Hotchkiss noted in the August 23, 2007 episode that "if Alistair's not dead, then Theresa's marriage to Ethan is not legal. She is a bigamist." Alistair reminded Theresa that he was her legal husband and, fearful of being made a laughingstock for making a non-Crane his heir, threatened to harm her if she told anyone about Little Ethan's paternity.

On August 29, 2007, Theresa finally revealed to an unconscious Ethan that he had a son during his hospitalization for the poisoning.  The next day a nurse told Theresa that she believed Ethan could indeed hear everything Theresa said. Theresa tested this by asking Ethan to squeeze her hand, which he did.  After Ethan woke up from his coma, he revealed he had heard Theresa's revelation that he has a son (although she had failed to mention his son's name or that she was the mother).  The two were overjoyed.  Theresa finally asked Pilar to go get Little Ethan.  As Pilar and Little Ethan walked into the hospital room, Gwen entered with a surprise.  She handed Ethan a baby boy and said, "This is your son, our son, yours and mine." The NBC run of Passions ended with Ethan holding the baby, Gwen smirking at her rival, and Theresa looking horrified.

DirecTV storylines
Devastated to learn Gwen allegedlyhad a son, Jonathan Winthrop, with Ethan, Theresa once again decided to tell the truth of her son's paternity only to be threatened by Gwen and Alistair into backing down. Ever relentless, Theresa planned on telling Ethan until her own mother begged her not to, eventually admitting that Gwen and Rebecca were blackmailing her because of her involvement in the massacre of the Vasquez family in Mexico twenty-five years before. An embittered Juanita Vasquez blamed Pilar and threatened to exterminate the entire Lopez family, just as Juanita's had been. Theresa could not tell Ethan the truth even when Jonathan in need of a liver donor needed the help of a sibling. When Jane failed to be compatible, Theresa arranged for her son Little Ethan to be used in the procedure. Unfortunately, to protect Little Ethan's paternity, she had to keep telling Ethan lies, alienating and infuriating him. Gwen took advantage of the situation by telling Ethan that Theresa had another lover.

Theresa, not wanting to lose Ethan, traveled to Mexico and was captured by Juanita who had acquired a vast fortune after taking over the drug cartel of her deceased husband Carlos Vasquez. The massacre had left Juanita determined to revenge herself upon the entire Lopez-Fitzgerald family. She threatened Theresa with a loaded gun after hearing her life story and later used her as bait in order to trick her mother into coming to Mexico as well. After making their escape from Juanita's compound, Theresa and Pilar made it to a wharf where Theresa found a boat the pair planned to use to escape Mexico. Believing they had escaped, Juanita fired a rocket at their boat and it exploded, leaving Pilar injured and Theresa missing. Ethan and Luis, who along with Miguel had followed Theresa and Pilar to Mexico in order to attempt to protect them, both swam to the wreckage where Pilar was recovered and taken back to shore, while Theresa struggled to keep herself alive in the shark-infested waters. Ethan and Theresa were briefly reunited only to have Theresa pulled further out to sea as Ethan was pulled under and caught in the wreckage. As everyone awaited news of Theresa's fate, Tabitha and Kay watched as Theresa tried to get the attention of her family only to find it was her ghost struggling to communicate with them. Finally, a rescue worker came with news that Theresa's bloody and torn blouse had washed up on shore and her family was grief-stricken by the news. In a rare soliloquy, Ethan credited Theresa with having made him into the man he was, promised to raise her children, and bade her farewell on the wharf.

On March 4, 2008, it was revealed that Theresa is alive and wasn't eaten alive by sharks. She was saved by DEA agents presumably looking to prosecute Juanita and was placed into protective custody; however, Theresa quickly escaped and met up with a Mexican woman with a plan to enter the United States illegally via a freight train, eventually returning to Harmony. She then infiltrated the Crane mansion disguised as a frumpy nanny named Gertrude. Little Ethan and Pilar realized that Gertrude was really Theresa, but were persuaded to keep quiet for the sake of the family's staying below Juanita's radar. While in disguise, Theresa drugged Ethan and made love with him, narrowly escaping being caught by Gwen.

In the last days leading up to the finale, Ethan planned to renew his wedding vows to Gwen as a means of providing a mother for Jane, Little Ethan, and Jonathan; meanwhile, "Gertrude" plotted ineffectually to disrupt the ceremony and Pilar made arrangements to remove her entire family from Harmony to evade Juanita as soon as the weddings were over. On the day of the triple wedding ceremonies, while a volcanic eruption threatened the city in the aftermath of the first two weddings, Theresa found Juanita, dressed as a nun, planting a bomb in the church basement. Juanita overpowered Theresa and chained her to a pillar as Gwen and Ethan renewed their marriage in the third ceremony in the main sanctuary one floor over Theresa's head.

Just after making his vows, however, Ethan sensed Theresa was in danger and rushed to the basement to find her. Theresa and Ethan were finally reunited in the August 4, 2008 episode of Passions. Theresa was still chained to the building as Luis apprehended Juanita and the timer on the bomb ticked inexorably toward zero. Ethan and Theresa's family refused to abandon her, nor would their spouses abandon any of them, and so nearly all of Harmony was crowded into that basement. Ethan, in possession of heretofore undisclosed wiring expertise, stopped the bomb a scant few seconds before it would have gone off. But Ethan and Theresa's problems continued as Ethan was reminded by Gwen of his vows. Ethan withdrew reluctantly from Theresa as Sheridan and others pleaded with Gwen to be merciful and release Ethan from his marital obligation.

Upstairs, Little Ethan worked steadily to fix Sam Bennett's broken camera, which had recorded Gwen and Rebecca making a full confession to the extent of their collusion against Theresa and lies to Ethan over the previous decade. Rebecca attempted to stop him, but he evaded her and rushed down to the basement. The video camera was attached to a television and played for all the wedding guests Gwen and Rebecca's confession of their roles in framing Theresa for the tabloid scandal seven years before. An indignant Ethan rejected Gwen and announced that not only was he leaving her but that he and Theresa would be raising her son, Jonathan. Sam and Luis then arrested Gwen and Rebecca on charges including fraud, bribery, and accessory status in the murder of Pilar's sister and nephews in Mexico as well as everyone in the basement of the church.

With Juanita caught and Gwen's threats neutralized, Theresa also seized the opportunity to tell Ethan the truth about Little Ethan; Ethan reacted with joy, and the family was united at last. Gwen and Rebecca began arguing over a trip to Las Vegas some years before which Gwen didn't remember, and it was revealed that Gwen had drunkenly married an unknown stranger, to whom she was still legally bound. Because this happened before Gwen's marriage to Ethan in 2002, that marriage was nullified.

Theresa and Ethan were finally married in a church ceremony as they both had dreamed of, in front of family and friends at St. Margaret Mary's church on August 7, 2008, in the final scene of Passions.

See also
Lopez-Fitzgerald family
Crane family
Bennett and Standish families

References

External links
Theresa Lopez-Fitzgerald profile - SoapCentral.com
Theresa Lopez-Fitzgerald at NBC

Passions characters
Fictional female businesspeople
Fictional nannies
Television characters introduced in 1999
Female characters in television